Collaboration is a 1987 studio album by Helen Merrill, arranged by Gil Evans. With the almost identical repertoire of recorded songs –though in another order–  and following Evans' original scores it is a celebratory re-recording of their previous collaboration from 30 years ago for Merrill's album Dream of You, released in 1957 also on EmArcy. The one exception is the opener, "Summertime" from Porgy and Bess, that Evans recorded with Miles Davis in 1958, it replaces "You're Lucky to Me". Like Dream of You Collaboration was recorded on three consecutive recording sessions each with a different line-up, one with woodwinds and trombone for most songs, featuring soprano saxophonist Steve Lacy on two tracks, one session with brass and another with a string section and woodwind.

Reception

The AllMusic review by Scott Yanow awarded the album four and a half stars and said "This inspired outing, one of the most rewarding sets of Helen Merrill's later years, was also one of Evans' last great dates and one of his few post-1972 classics. 57 at the time, Merrill is in superb form on such numbers as 'Where Flamingos Fly,' 'A New Town Is a Blue Town,' 'By Myself' and 'Anyplace I Hang My Hat Is Home.'" The Penguin Guide to Jazz described the album as "One of the strangest singer-and-orchestra records ever made", and highlighted the slow tempos, "barely moving textures" and "long, carefully held tones of the vocalist".

Track listing
 "Summertime" (George Gershwin, DuBose Heyward) – 4:27
 "Where Flamingos Fly" (John Benson Brooks, Harold Courlander, Elthea Peale) – 3:07
 "Dream of You" (Sy Oliver, Jimmie Lunceford, Michael Morales) – 2:51
 "I'm a Fool to Want You" (Joel Herron, Jack Wolf, Frank Sinatra) – 4:30
 "Troubled Waters" (Arthur Johnston, Sam Coslow) – 3:26
 "I'm Just a Lucky So and So" (Duke Ellington, Mack David) – 3:09
 "People Will Say We're in Love" (Richard Rodgers, Oscar Hammerstein II) – 2:49
 "By Myself" (Arthur Schwartz, Howard Dietz) – 3:38
 "Any Place I Hang My Hat Is Home" (Harold Arlen, Johnny Mercer) – 4:55
 "I've Never Seen" (Don Marcotte) – 4:19
 "He Was Too Good to Me" (Rodgers, Lorenz Hart) – 3:15
 "A New Town Is a Blue Town" (Jerry Ross, Richard Adler) – 3:35

Personnel
Helen Merrill – vocals
Gil Evans – arranger, conductor

The Gil Evans Orchestra

Tracks 1, 2, 6, 9 and 12, session of August 25, 1987
Steve Lacy – soprano saxophone (as special guest on 1 and 9 only)
Danny Bank – flute, bass clarinet
Phil Bodner – flute, alto flute, bass clarinet
Jerry Dodgion – flute, soprano saxophone
Chris Hunter – flute, clarinet, oboe
Wally Kane – bass clarinet, bassoon (except 12)
Roger Rosenberg – bass clarinet (12)
Jimmy Knepper – trombone
Gil Goldstein – piano, keyboards
Joe Beck – guitar
Buster Williams – double bass
Mel Lewis – drums, percussion

Tracks 3, 7 and 8, session of August 26, 1987
Lew Soloff – trumpet
Shunzo Ohno – trumpet, flugelhorn
Jimmy Knepper – trombone
Dave Taylor – bass trombone
Chris Hunter – soprano saxophone, alto saxophone, piccolo
Danny Bank – baritone saxophone
Gil Goldstein – piano, keyboards
Joe Beck – guitar
Buster Williams – double bass
Mel Lewis – drums

Tracks 4, 5, 10 and 11, session of August 18, 1987
String quintet
Harry Lookofsky – violin, tenor violin
Lamar Alsop – viola, violin
Harold Coletta, Theodore Israel – viola
Jesse Levy – cello
Phil Bodner – woodwinds
Gil Goldstein – piano, keyboards
Jay Berliner – guitar
Buster Williams – double bass
Mel Lewis – drums

Production
Kiyoshi "Boxman" Koyama, Helen Merrill – producers
Tom Lazarus – recording and mix engineer
Rebecca Everett – second engineer
Dan Morgenstern – liner notes

References

EmArcy Records albums
Helen Merrill albums
Albums arranged by Gil Evans
1986 albums